In10sity is the tenth studio album by Pink Cream 69. It is the first album to feature additional guitarist Uwe Reitenauer and also celebrates the band's 20th year making music.

Track listing

Only on the Japanese release, track 12 "My Darkest Hour" is replaced with "Slave to What I Crave."

Personnel

Band members
David Readman - vocals
Alfred Koffler - guitar, keyboards
Uwe Reitenauer - guitar
Dennis Ward - bass guitar, keyboards, backing vocals, producer, engineer, mixing
Kosta Zafiriou - drums

2007 albums
Pink Cream 69 albums
Frontiers Records albums
Albums produced by Dennis Ward (musician)